Wansford is a village in the East Riding of Yorkshire, England; it forms part of the civil parish of Skerne and Wansford. It is situated on the B1249 road and just to the north of the River Hull and the Driffield Canal.
The church of St Mary the Virgin, Wansford was built in 1866–68 to designs by G.E. Street. It is on the Sykes Churches Trail devised by the East Yorkshire Churches Group. The church was designated a Grade II* listed building in 1966 and is now recorded in the National Heritage List for England, maintained by Historic England.

References

Villages in the East Riding of Yorkshire